Declan Meehan may refer to:

 Declan Meehan (radio presenter), Irish radio presenter
 Declan Meehan (Gaelic footballer) (born 1976), Irish Gaelic footballer